Simon Morris (born 1977) is a British business entrepreneur specialising in property.

Career

In 2008, SRM Holdings went into administration. This was primarily due to negative publicity from a BBC Panorama documentary, which later turned out to be without foundation and after extensive investigation no charges where ever bought.

Two weeks after his businesses went bust, Morris was arrested as part of an investigation into money laundering and conspiracy to defraud based on allegations brought up by the administrations of the companies involved. Morris was convicted of blackmail and sentenced to 18 months in prison.

Simon Morris has since operated in an Investment Business in London and offers guides and advice on investment options in London.

References

External links
 

1977 births
Living people
21st-century British criminals
Date of birth missing (living people)
Businesspeople from Leeds
Leeds United F.C. non-playing staff